The men's long jump at the 2002 European Athletics Championships were held at the Olympic Stadium on August 9–11.

Medalists

Results

Qualification
Qualification: Qualification Performance 7.95 (Q) or at least 12 best performers advance to the final.

Final

External links
Results

Long
Long jump at the European Athletics Championships